Domenico Blanditi (died 1651) was a Roman Catholic prelate who served as Bishop of Umbriatico (1650–1651).

Biography
Domenico Blanditi was born in Naples, Italy.
On 22 Aug 1650, he was appointed during the papacy of Pope Innocent X as Bishop of Umbriatico.
On 9 Oct 1650, he was consecrated bishop by Giovanni Giacomo Panciroli, Cardinal-Priest of Santo Stefano al Monte Celio, with Luca Torreggiani, Archbishop of Ravenna, and Pedro Urbina Montoya, Archbishop of Valencia, serving as co-consecrators. 
He served as Bishop of Umbriatico until his death in 1651.

References

External links and additional sources
 (for Chronology of Bishops) 
 (for Chronology of Bishops) 

17th-century Italian Roman Catholic bishops
Bishops appointed by Pope Innocent X
1651 deaths